Malovište is a village in the municipality of Bitola, North Macedonia. It used to be part of the former municipality of Capari.

History 
Malovište is an old Aromanian settlement in the region and its establishment dates possibly prior to the Ottoman conquest of the Balkans. During the first World War, Malovište was occupied by the Bulgarian military who evacuated most of the Aromanian villagers and sent them into the interior of Bulgaria and Serbia. The relocation of local Aromanians was due to Bulgarian forces being concerned that pro-Greek and pro-Serbian sympathies existed among them resulting in possible cooperation with the Entente Allies. While in exile, some villagers had to fend for themselves whereas others for the Bulgarians did forced labour.

Demographics
According to the 2002 census, the village had a total of 98 inhabitants. Ethnic groups in the village include:

Vlachs (Aromanians) 87
Macedonians 10
Albanians 1

Notable people
 Constantin Belimace, Romanian and Yugoslav poet

References

External links
 Visit Macedonia

Villages in Bitola Municipality
Aromanian settlements in North Macedonia